Government College, Chittur is an educational institutions located in Chittur, Palakkad, Kerala. The college is affiliated to the University of Calicut and recognized as a special-grade college under the Department of Collegiate Education, Government of Kerala.

History
The college was established on 11 August 1947, by Cherubala Karunakara Menon, ICS, Devan of erstwhile Cochin state. Initially under the University of Madras and got affiliated to Travancore University in 1949. It started functioning in the present 40 acre campus on the bank of Sokanasini river since 1954.

Academics
The college provides undergraduate and postgraduate education in science, arts and commerce streams. There are 15 departments: Geography, Botany, Chemistry, Commerce, Economics, Electronics, History, Malayalam, Mathematics, Music, Philosophy, Physics, English, Tamil, and Zoology. The Departments of Tamil, Geography, Philosophy, Music and Mathematics are the research departments under the University of Calicut. It has been accredited by NAAC with an A Grade (CGPA 3.01 out of 4).

Notable alumni
 Thiruvizha Jayashankar, classical Music Performer
 T K Noushad, Ex MLA

See also
List of institutions of higher education in Kerala
List of colleges affiliated to the University of Calicut

References

External links

Arts and Science colleges in Kerala
Universities and colleges in Palakkad district
Colleges affiliated with the University of Calicut
1947 establishments in India
Academic institutions formerly affiliated with the University of Madras